The Rockwell Automation Headquarters is an office building located in Milwaukee, Wisconsin. The building is known for once having the largest four-faced clock in the world.

Clock Tower

History
The Allen-Bradley Clock Tower, owned by Allen-Bradley, a product brand of Rockwell Automation, has long been a landmark in Milwaukee. According to the Guinness Book of World Records: "The largest four-faced clock is that on the research and office addition of the Allen-Bradley Company. Each face has a diameter of 40 feet, 3-1/2 inches. Dedicated on October 31, 1962, it rises 280 feet from the streets of Milwaukee, and requires 34.6 kilowatts of electricity for lighting and power." It has since been surpassed by the 141-foot clock faces of the Abraj Al Bait.

The original plan for the clock tower date as far back as 1959, when it appears on early drawings for the proposed addition. Created by architect Fitzhugh Scott, the plans included several towers in its design, only one of which would house a clock. This was scaled back, however a smaller tower on an existing building was kept and modified to display the outdoor temperature using a large digital display. The interest in creating the tower was Harry Bradley, younger of the firm's two founding brothers. An inventor, Bradley including in his tinkering several of the clocks which he owned.

The Clock Tower's lighted faces have been used as a navigation aid for Lake Michigan mariners over the years, except during the 1973 oil crisis when the clock was unlit from November 1973 to June 1974.

Clock size
Because the octagonal faces are nearly twice the size of the faces of London's Big Ben, chimes were never added in an attempt to allow Big Ben to remain the largest four-faced chiming clock in the world. In fact, that title has belonged to the Minneapolis City Hall clock since 1909.

Appearance in popular culture
The tower made an appearance on the NASCAR Busch Series race car of Mike Bliss in 2004. To celebrate Rockwell Automation and Allen-Bradley's 100-year association, the #20 Rockwell Automation car was painted black with gold accents, along with the Rockwell/Allen-Bradley 100 Years symbol on the hood and quarter panels. The Clock Tower was depicted on the car in front of the wheel well. In Season 1, Episode 3 of Apple TV series Ted Lasso, the title character references spending three hours and 42 minutes alone at the Clock Tower.

See also

Abraj Al Bait
Big Ben
List of tallest buildings in Milwaukee

References

External links 
 NGS Survey of the Tower
 Allen-Bradley Tower Clock Description

Skyscraper office buildings in Milwaukee
Landmarks in Wisconsin
Clock towers in Wisconsin
Headquarters in the United States
South Side, Milwaukee